CTTNBP2 N-terminal-like protein is a protein that in humans is encoded by the CTTNBP2NL gene. It is a substrate for phosphorylation.

Interactions 

CTTNBP2NL has been shown to interact with:

 FAM40A, and 
 MOBKL3, 
 PDCD10, 
 PPP2CA,
 PPP2R1A, 
 RP6-213H19.1, 
 STK24, 
 STRN3,  and
 STRN.

References

External links

Further reading